This is a list of earthquakes in 1969. Only magnitude 6.0 or greater earthquakes appear on the list. Lower magnitude events are included if they have caused death, injury or damage. Events which occurred in remote areas will be excluded from the list as they wouldn't have generated significant media interest. All dates are listed according to UTC time. Maximum intensities are indicated on the Mercalli intensity scale and are sourced from United States Geological Survey (USGS) ShakeMap data. Activity generally was slightly below average with 14 events reaching magnitude 7 or greater. In August, the largest event of the year struck the Kuril Islands, Russia measuring 8.2. Other large events struck offshore Portugal and Indonesia. The Americas had no events above magnitude 7 which is an uncommon occurrence. Of the 4,000 deaths from earthquakes two events dominated. Southeastern China had an earthquake of magnitude 5.7 in July which contributed 4,024 of the total. Indonesia had the bulk of the rest of the death toll.

Overall

By death toll 

 Note: At least 10 casualties

By magnitude 

 Note: At least 7.0 magnitude

Notable events

January

February

March

April

May

June

July

August

September

October

November

December

References

1969
 
1969